FC Golden State Force is an American soccer team based in Whittier, California, United States that currently plays in USL League Two. The club currently plays at Rio Hondo College.

In mid-2019, the club announced Los Angeles Force, a professional team that will compete in the National Independent Soccer Association.

Year-by-year

Honors
 USL PDL Western Conference Champions 2017
 USL PDL Southwest Division Champions 2017, 2018
 USL League Two Western Conference Champions 2019
 USL League Two Southwest Division Champions 2019

References

External links
 

USL League Two teams
Whittier, California
Soccer clubs in Greater Los Angeles